Pick tapping (or pick trilling) is a legato playing technique for the guitar, in which the edge of the pick is used to sharply trill notes on the instrument's fretboard at fast speeds. Whilst trilling can be performed with the fingers of either the fretting or picking hand, using the pick enables faster speeds by means of 'vibrating' (or effectively seizing up) the wrist. The technique should not be confused with regular tapping, which always makes use of both hands and involves playing at least three or more notes.

A well-known example is "Satch Boogie" by Joe Satriani, in which there is a section that uses pick tapping to produce trills at 22.2 notes per second. Other examples include "Surfing with the Alien", also by Satriani; "Inca Roads" by Frank Zappa; and various songs by DragonForce.
 

Guitar performance techniques